Bekzod Khidirov (Бекзод Хидиров; born December 18, 1981) is a boxer from Uzbekistan, who participated at the 2004 Summer Olympics for his native Asian country. There he was stopped in the round of sixteen of the Featherweight (57 kg) division by Kazakhstan's Galib Jafarov.

External links
 Profile at Yahoo Sports
 

1981 births
Living people
Uzbekistani male boxers
Olympic boxers of Uzbekistan
Boxers at the 2004 Summer Olympics
Asian Games medalists in boxing
Asian Games silver medalists for Uzbekistan
Asian Games bronze medalists for Uzbekistan
Boxers at the 2002 Asian Games
Boxers at the 2006 Asian Games
Medalists at the 2002 Asian Games
Medalists at the 2006 Asian Games
Bantamweight boxers